Joseph-Gabriel Imbert, also known as Frère Imbert (1666–1749) was a French painter and Carthusian monk. Among his pupils were Adrien Manglard and Joseph Siffred Duplessis.

Biography
Imbert was born in Occitania in 1666. He was active in the charterhouse of Villeneuve-lès-Avignon, but was originally from Marseille, as in a note on his Fuite en Egypte it is detailed that «[E]t les deux autres représentant la Fuitte en Egipte […] peint[s] par un frère chartreux de ladite maison nommé Imbert de Marseille, ces trois tableaux sont forts haut[s] et remplissent depuis le haut des stales presque jusqu’à la voûte»
He was a pupil of French painter and art theorist Charles Le Brun.

He realized several paintings for the Carthusian Monastery of Notre-Dame-du-Val-de-Bénédiction in Villeneuve-lès-Avignon, near Gard, Occitania, including a large painting depicting the Flight into Egypt, a copy of Guido Reni's Annunciation, an oil on panel depicting the Marquise of Ganges in the Chartreusine costume of Saint Roseline de Villeneuve, and a Compassion de la Vierge (Compassion of the Virgin), now lost. Regarding the lost painting, it was recorded that «Du cotté oposé il y a […] et les deux autres représentant […] et la Compassion de la Sainte Vierge, peint[s] par un frère chartreux de ladite maison nommé Imbert de Marseille, ces trois tableaux sont forts haut[s] et remplissent depuis le haut des stales presque jusqu’à la voûte»

Frère Imbert executed also "smaller paintings, works on easel of more intimate expression, and copies of paintings of the preceding century, such as Nicolas Mignard's Annunciation."  Imbert "was not only a talented copyist. He was [also] able to elaborate powerful compositions, such as [his] Flight into Egypt […]"

Imbert became a Carthusian monk, and later opened an art school in either Marseille or Avignon. There, he taught Joseph Siffred Duplessis and Adrien Manglard. The latter reportedly learned figure painting with him.

The figure of Frère Imbert is still relatively shrouded in mystery.

Gallery

References

Bibliography

External links
 Joseph-Gabriel Imbert at CCfr
 Joseph-Gabriel Imbert's gallery at Ministère de la Culture

17th-century French painters
French male painters
1666 births
1749 deaths
Artists from Marseille
Artists from Avignon